The 1938 Giro di Lombardia was the 34th edition of the Giro di Lombardia cycle race and was held on 23 October 1938, over a course of . The race started and finished in Milan.

101 cyclists departed from Milan and 60 completed the race.

General classification

References

External links
 

1938
Giro di Lombardia
Giro di Lombardia